Depolymerization (or depolymerisation) is the process of converting a polymer into a monomer or a mixture of monomers. This process is driven by an increase in entropy.

Ceiling temperature
The tendency of polymers to depolymerize is indicated by their ceiling temperature.  At this temperature, the enthalpy of polymerization matches the entropy gained by converting a large molecule into monomers.  Above the ceiling temperature, the rate of depolymerization is greater than the rate of polymerization, which inhibits the formation of the given polymer.

Applications
Depolymerization is a very common process.  Digestion of food involves depolymerization of macromolecules, such as proteins.  It is relevant to polymer recycling. Sometimes the depolymerization is well behaved, and clean monomers can be reclaimed and reused for making new plastic.  In other cases, such as polyethylene, depolymerization gives a mixture of products. These products are, for polyethylene, ethylene, propylene, isobutylene, 1-hexene and heptane. Out of these, only ethylene can be used for polyethylene production, so other gases must be turned into ethylene, sold, or otherwise be destroyed or be disposed of by turning them into other products.

Depolymerization is also related to production of chemicals and fuels from biomass.  In this case, reagents are typically required.  A simple case is the hydrolysis of celluloses to glucose by the action of water.  Generally this process requires an acid catalyst:
H(C6H10O5)nOH  +  (n - 1) H2O   →    n  C6H12O6

See also
 Thermal depolymerization
 Polymer degradation
 Polymerisation
 Ceiling temperature
 Chain scission

References

External links

Polymers
Plastic recycling